Temnikov (Temnikav; , Čopolt oš) is a town and the administrative center of Temnikovsky District in the Republic of Mordovia, Russia. As of the 2010 Census, its population was 7,243.

History

The oldest town in the Republic of Mordovia, it was established in 1536. Town status was granted to it in 1779.

Administrative and municipal status
Within the framework of administrative divisions, Temnikov serves as the administrative center of Temnikovsky District. As an administrative division, it is incorporated within Temnikovsky District as the town of district significance of Temnikov. As a municipal division, the town of district significance of Temnikov is incorporated within Temnikovsky Municipal District as Temnikovskoye Urban Settlement.

Notable residents 

Dmitri Proshin (born 1974), footballer

See also
 Alena Arzamasskaia

References

Notes

Sources

Государственное Собрание Республики Мордовия. Республика Мордовия. Административно-территориальное деление на 1 октября 1997 г. (Republic of Mordovia. Administrative-Territorial Divisions as of October 1, 1997) Типография "Красный Октябрь". Саранск, 1998.

Cities and towns in Mordovia
Temnikovsky District
Temnikovsky Uyezd